Heterocampa amanda is a species of moth in the family Notodontidae (the prominents). It was first described by William Barnes and Arthur Ward Lindsey in 1921 and it is found in North America.

The MONA or Hodges number for Heterocampa amanda is 7992.

References

Further reading

 
 
 

Notodontidae
Articles created by Qbugbot
Moths described in 1921